Cassen is a commune in the Landes department in Nouvelle-Aquitaine in southwestern France.

Cassen may also refer to:

 Bernard Cassen (born 1937), French journalist
 Robert Cassen (born 1935), British economist

See also
 Cassens, a surname